This is a list of common names of fish. While some common names refer to a single species, others may be used for an entire group of species, such as a genus or family, and still others have been used confusingly for multiple unrelated species or groups; the articles listed here should attempt to list the possible meanings if the common name is ambiguous. Scientific names for individual species and higher taxa are included in parentheses.



A

 African glass catfish (Pareutropius debauwi)
 African lungfish (genus Protopterus)
 Aholehole (genus Kuhlia and family Kuhliidae)
 Airbreathing catfish (family Clariidae)
 Airsac catfish (genus Heteropneustes)
 Alaska blackfish
 Albacore
 Alewife
 Alfonsino
 Algae eater (numerous species that are not necessarily closely related)
 Alligatorfish (family Agonidae)
 Alligator gar
 Amberjack (genus Seriola)
 American sole (family Achiridae)
 Amur pike
 Anchovy (family Engraulidae)
 Anemonefish (subfamily Amphiprioninae of family Pomacentridae)
 Angelfish (numerous unrelated taxa, including family Pomacanthidae, family Squatinidae, genus Pterophyllum, the Atlantic pomfret, the Atlantic spadefish, and the cave angelfish)
 Angler (Lophius piscatorius)
 Angler catfish (genus Chaca)
 Anglerfish (order Lophiiformes)
 Antarctic cod
 Antarctic icefish (suborder Notothenioidei of order Perciformes)
 Antenna codlet (Bregmaceros atlanticus)
 Arapaima (genus Arapaima)
 Archerfish (genus Toxotes and family Toxotidae)
 Arctic char
 Armored gurnard (family Peristediidae)
 Armored searobin (family Peristediidae)
 Armorhead (family Pentacerotidae)
 Armorhead catfish (genus Cranoglanis)
 Armoured catfish
 Arowana (family Osteoglossidae)
 Arrowtooth eel (several species, including Dysomma anguillare, Dysomma brevirostre, Histiobranchus bathybius, Synaphobranchus kaupii, and Ilyophis brunneus)
 Asian carp
 Asiatic glassfish (family Ambassidae)
 Atka mackerel
 Atlantic bonito
 Atlantic cod
 Atlantic herring
 Atlantic salmon
 Atlantic sharpnose shark
 Atlantic saury
 Atlantic silverside
 Australasian salmon (genus Arripis and family Arripidae)
 Australian grayling
 Australian herring
 Australian lungfish
 Australian prowfish (family Pataecidae)
 Ayu (Plecoglossus altivelis)

B

 Baikal oilfish
 Bala shark
 Ballan wrasse
 Bamboo shark
 Banded killifish
 Bandfish
 Banjo
 Bangus
 Banjo catfish
 Barb
 Barbel
 Barbeled dragonfish
 Barbeled houndshark
 Barbel-less catfish
 Barfish
 Barracuda
 Barracudina
 Barramundi
 Barred danio
 Barreleye
 Basking shark
 Bass
 Basslet
 Batfish
 Bat ray
 Beachsalmon
 Beaked salmon
 Beaked sandfish
 Beardfish
 Beluga sturgeon
 Bengal danio
 Betta
 Bichir
 Bicolor goat fish
 Bigeye
 Bigeye squaretail
 Bighead carp
 Bigmouth buffalo
 Bigscale
 Bigscale pomfret
 Billfish
 Bitterling
 Black angelfish
 Black bass
 Black dragonfish
 Blackchin
 Blackfin Tuna
 Blackfish
 Black neon tetra
 Blacktip reef shark
 Black mackerel
 Black scalyfin
 Black sea bass
 Black scabbardfish
 Black swallower
 Black tetra
 Black triggerfish
 Bleak
 Blenny
 Blind goby
 Blind shark
 Blobfish
 Blowfish
 Blue catfish
 Blue danio
 Blue-redstripe danio
 Blue eye trevalla
 Bluefin tuna
 Bluefish
 Bluegill
 Blue gourami
 Blue shark
 Blue triggerfish
 Blue whiting
 Bluntnose knifefish
 Bluntnose minnow
 Boafish
 Boarfish
 Bobtail snipe eel
 Bocaccio
 Boga
 Bombay duck
 Bonefish
 Bonito
 Bonnethead shark
 Bonnetmouth
 Bonytail
 Bonytongue
 Bowfin
 Boxfish
 Bramble shark
 Bream
 Brill
 Bristlemouth
 Bristlenose catfish
 Broadband dogfish
 Bronze corydoras
 Brook lamprey
 Brook stickleback
 Brook trout
 Brotula
 Brown trout
 Buffalo fish
 Bullhead
 Bullhead shark
 Bull shark
 Bull trout
 Burbot
 Bumblebee goby
 Buri
 Burma danio
 Burrowing goby
 Butterfish
 Butterfly ray
 Butterflyfish

C

 California flyingfish
 California halibut
 Canary rockfish
 Candiru
 Candlefish
 Capelin
 Cardinalfish
 Cardinal tetra
 Carp
 Carpetshark
 Carpsucker
 Catalufa
 Catfish
 Catla
 Cat shark
 Cavefish
 Celebes rainbowfish
 Central mudminnow
 Chain pickerel
 Channel bass
 Channel catfish
 Char
 Cherry salmon
 Chimaera
 Chinook salmon
 Cherubfish
 Chub
 Chubsucker
 Chum salmon
 Cichlid
 Cisco
 Climbing catfish
 Climbing gourami
 Climbing perch
 Clingfish
 Clownfish
 Clown loach
 Clown triggerfish
 Cobbler
 Cobia
 Cod
 Codlet
 Codling
 Coelacanth
 Coffinfish
 Coho salmon
 Coley
 Collared carpetshark
 Collared dogfish
 Colorado squawfish
 Combfish
 Combtail gourami
 Combtooth blenny
 Common carp
 Common tunny
 Conger eel
 Convict blenny
 Convict cichlid
 Cookie-cutter shark
 Coolie loach
 Cornetfish
 Cowfish
 Cownose ray
 Cow shark
 Crappie
 Creek chub
 Crestfish
 Crevice kelpfish
 Croaker
 Crocodile icefish
 Crocodile shark
 Crucian carp
 Cuckoo wrasse
 Cusk
 Cusk-eel
 Cutlassfish
 Cutthroat eel
 Cutthroat trout

D

 Dab 
 Dace 
 Daggertooth pike conger
 Damselfish 
 Danio 
 Darter 
 Dartfish 
 Dealfish 
 Death Valley pupfish
 Deep sea eel 
 Deep sea smelt 
 Deepwater cardinalfish 
 Deepwater flathead 
 Deepwater stingray
 Delta smelt 
 Demoiselle 
 Denticle herring 
 Desert pupfish
 Devario
 Devil ray 
 Dhufish
 Discus 
 Dogfish 
 Dogfish shark 
 Dogteeth tetra
 Dojo loach
 Dolly Varden trout
 Dolphin fish
 Dorab wolf-herring 
 Dorado
 Dory 
 Dottyback 
 Dragonet 
 Dragonfish 
 Dragon goby 
 Driftfish 
 Driftwood catfish 
 Drum 
 Duckbill 
 Duckbill eel
 Dusky grouper
 Dusky shark
 Dwarf gourami 
 Dwarf loach

E

 Eagle ray
 Earthworm eel
 Eel
 Eel cod
 Eel-goby
 Eelpout
 Eeltail catfish
 Elasmobranch
 Electric catfish
 Electric eel
 Electric knifefish
 Electric ray
 Elephant fish
 Elephantnose fish
 Elver
 Ember parrotfish
 Emerald catfish
 Emperor
 Emperor angelfish
 Emperor bream
 Escolar
 Eucla cod
 Eulachon
 European chub
 European eel
 European flounder
 European minnow
 European perch

F

 False brotula
 False cat shark
 False moray
 False trevally
 Fangtooth
 Fathead sculpin
 Featherback
 Fierasfer
 Fire goby
 Filefish
 Finback cat shark
 Fingerfish
 Fire bar danio
 Firefish
 Flabby whale fish
 Flagblenny
 Flagfin
 Flagfish
 Flagtail
 Flashlight fish
 Flatfish
 Flathead
 Flathead catfish
 Flier
 Flounder
 Flying gurnard
 Flying fish
 Footballfish
 Forehead brooder
 Four-eyed fish
 French angelfish
 Freshwater eel
 Freshwater hatchetfish
 Freshwater shark
 Frigate mackerel
 Frilled shark
 Frogfish
 Frogmouth catfish
 Fusilier fish

G

 Galjoen fish
 Ganges shark
 Gar
 Garden eel
 Garibaldi
 Garpike
 Ghost fish
 Ghost flathead
 Ghost knifefish
 Ghost pipefish
 Ghost shark
 Ghoul
 Giant danio
 Giant gourami
 Giant sea bass
 Gibberfish
 Gila trout
 Gizzard shad
 Glass catfish
 Glassfish
 Glass knifefish
 Glowlight danio
 Goatfish
 Goblin shark
 Goby
 Golden dojo
 Golden loach
 Golden shiner
 Golden trout
 Goldeye
 Goldfish
 Gombessa
 Goosefish
 Gopher rockfish
 Gourami
 Grass carp
 Graveldiver
 Grayling
 Gray mullet
 Gray reef shark
 Great white shark
 Green swordtail
 Greeneye
 Greenling
 Grenadier
 Green spotted puffer
 Ground shark
 Grouper
 Grunion
 Grunt
 Grunter
 Grunt sculpin
 Gudgeon
 Guitarfish
 Gulf menhaden
 Gulper eel
 Gulper
 Gunnel
 Guppy
 Gurnard

H

 Haddock
 Hagfish
 Hairtail
 Hake
 Halfbeak
 Halfmoon
 Halibut
 Halosaur
 Hamlet
 Hammerhead shark
 Hammerjaw
 Handfish
 Hardhead catfish
 Harelip sucker
 Hatchetfish
 Hawkfish
 Herring
 Herring smelt
 Hickory Shad
 Hillstream loach
 Hog sucker
 Hoki
 Horn shark
 Horsefish
 Houndshark
 Huchen
 Humuhumunukunukuapua'a
 Hussar

I

 Icefish
 Ide
 Ilish/Hilsha
 Inanga
 Inconnu

J

 Jack
 Jackfish
 Jack Dempsey
 Japanese eel
 Javelin
 Jawfish
 Jellynose fish
 Jewelfish
 Jewel tetra
 Jewfish
 John Dory

K

 Kafue pike
 Kahawai
 Kaluga
 Kanyu
 Kelp perch
 Kelpfish
 Killifish
 King of the herrings
 Kingfish
 King-of-the-salmon
 Kissing gourami
 Knifefish
 Knifejaw
 Koi
 Kokanee
 Kokopu
 Kuhli loach

L

 Labyrinth fish
 Ladyfish
 Lake chub
 Lake trout
 Lake whitefish
 Lampfish
 Lamprey
 Lancetfish
 Lanternfish
 Largemouth bass
 Leaffish
 Leatherjacket
 Lefteye flounder
 Lemon shark
 Lemon sole
 Lemon tetra
 Lenok
 Leopard danio
 Lightfish
 Limia
 Lined sole
 Ling
 Ling cod
 Lionfish
 Livebearer
 Lizardfish
 Loach
 Loach catfish
 Loach goby
 Loach minnow
 Longfin
 Longfin dragonfish
 Longfin escolar
 Longfin smelt
 Long-finned char
 Long-finned pike
 Long-finned sand diver
 Longjaw mudsucker
 Longneck eel
 Longnose chimaera
 Longnose dace
 Longnose lancetfish
 Longnose sucker
 Longnose whiptail catfish
 Long-whiskered catfish
 Loosejaw
 Lost River sucker
 Louvar
 Loweye catfish
 Luderick
 Luminous hake
 Lumpsucker
 Lungfish

M

 Mackerel
 Mackerel shark
 Madtom
 Mahi-mahi
 Mahseer
 Mail-cheeked fish
 Mako shark
 Mandarinfish
 Manefish
 Man-of-war fish
 Manta ray
 Marblefish
 Marine hatchetfish
 Marlin
 Masu salmon
 Medaka
 Medusafish
 Megamouth shark
 Menhaden
 Merluccid hake
 Mexican golden trout
 Midshipman fish
 Milkfish
 Minnow
 Minnow of the deep 
 Modoc sucker
 Mojarra
 Mola mola
 Monkeyface prickleback
 Monkfish
 Mooneye
 Moonfish
 Moorish idol
 Mora
 Moray eel
 Morid cod
 Morwong
 Moses sole
 Mosquitofish
 Mouthbrooder
 Mozambique tilapia
 Mrigal
 Mud catfish
 Mudfish
 Mud minnow
 Mudskipper
 Mudsucker
 Mullet
 Mummichog
 Murray cod
 Muskellunge
 Mustache triggerfish
 Mustard eel

N

 Naked-back knifefish
 Nase
 Needlefish
 Neon tetra
 New World rivuline
 New Zealand sand diver
 New Zealand smelt
 Nibble fish
 Noodlefish
 North American darter
 North American freshwater catfish
 North Pacific daggertooth
 Northern anchovy
 Northern clingfish
 Northern lampfish
 Northern pike
 Northern sea robin
 Northern squawfish
 Northern stargazer
 Notothen
 Nurseryfish
 Nurse shark

O

 Oarfish
 Ocean perch
 Ocean sunfish
 Oceanic whitetip shark
 Oilfish
 Oldwife
 Old World knifefish
 Olive flounder
 Opah
 Opaleye
 Orange roughy
 Orangespine unicorn fish
 Orangestriped triggerfish
 Orbicular batfish
 Orbicular velvetfish
 Oregon chub
 Orfe
 Oriental loach
 Oscar
 Owens pupfish

P

 Pacific albacore
 Pacific cod
 Pacific hake
 Pacific herring
 Pacific lamprey
 Pacific rudderfish
 Pacific salmon
 Pacific saury
 Pacific trout
 Pacific viperfish
 Paddlefish
 Pancake batfish
 Panga
 Paradise fish
 Parasitic catfish
 Parore
 Parrotfish
 Peacock flounder
 Peamouth
 Pearleye
 Pearlfish
 Pearl danio
 Pearl perch
 Pelagic cod
 Pelican eel
 Pelican gulper
 Pencil catfish
 Pencilfish
 Pencilsmelt
 Peppered corydoras
 Perch
 Peters' elephantnose fish
 Pickerel
 Pigfish
 Pike conger
 Pike eel
 Pike
 Pikeblenny
 Pikeperch
 Pilchard
 Pilot fish
 Pineapplefish
 Pineconefish
 Pink salmon 
 Píntano
 Pipefish
 Piranha
 Pirarucu
 Pirate perch
 Plaice
 Platy
 Platyfish
 Pleco
 Plownose chimaera
 Poacher
 Pollyfish
 Pollock
 Pomfret
 Pompano
 Pompano dolphinfish
 Ponyfish
 Popeye catalufa
 Porbeagle shark
 Porcupinefish
 Porgy
 Port Jackson shark
 Powen
 Prickleback
 Pricklefish
 Prickly shark
 Prowfish
 Pufferfish
 Pumpkinseed
 Pupfish
 Pygmy sunfish

Q

 Queen danio
 Queen parrotfish
 Queen triggerfish
 Quillback
 Quillfish

R

 Rabbitfish
 Raccoon butterfly fish
 Ragfish
 Rainbow trout
 Rainbowfish
 Rasbora
 Rock gunnel
 Ratfish
 Rattail
 Ray
 Razorback sucker
 Razorfish
 Red grouper
 Red salmon
 Red snapper
 Redfin perch
 Redfish
 Redhorse sucker
 Redlip blenny
 Redmouth whalefish
 Redtooth triggerfish
 Red velvetfish
 Red whalefish
 Reedfish
 Reef triggerfish
 Remora
 Requiem shark
 Ribbon eel
 Ribbon sawtail fish
 Ribbonfish
 Rice eel
 Ricefish
 Ridgehead
 Riffle dace
 Righteye flounder
 Rio Grande perch
 River loach
 River shark
 River stingray
 Rivuline
 Roach
 Roanoke bass
 Rock bass
 Rock beauty
 Rock cod
 Rocket danio
 Rockfish
 Rockling
 Rockweed gunnel
 Rohu
 Ronquil
 Roosterfish
 Ropefish
 Rough scad
 Rough sculpin
 Roughy
 Roundhead
 Round herring
 Round stingray
 Round whitefish
 Rudd
 Rudderfish
 Ruffe
 Russian sturgeon

S

 Sábalo
 Sabertooth
 Saber-toothed blenny
 Sabertooth fish
 Sablefish
 Stromateidae
 Sacramento blackfish
 Sacramento splittail
 Sailfin silverside
 Sailfish
 Salamanderfish
 Salmon
 Salmon shark
 Sandbar shark
 Sandburrower
 Sand dab
 Sand diver
 Sand eel
 Sandfish
 Sand goby
 Sand knifefish
 Sand lance
 Sandperch
 Sandroller
 Sand stargazer
 Sand tiger
 Sand tilefish
 Sandbar shark
 Sarcastic fringehead
 Sardine
 Sargassum fish
 Sauger
 Saury
 Sawfish
 Saw shark
 Sawtooth eel
 Scabbard fish
 Scaly dragonfish
 Scat
 Scissortail rasbora
 Scorpionfish
 Sculpin
 Scup
 Sea bass
 Sea bream
 Sea catfish
 Sea chub
 Sea devil
 Sea dragon
 Sea lamprey
 Sea raven
 Sea snail
 Sea toad
 Seahorse
 Seamoth
 Searobin
 Sevan trout
 Sergeant major
 Shad
 Shark
 Sharksucker
 Sharpnose puffer
 Sheatfish
 Sheepshead
 Sheepshead minnow
 Shiner
 Shortnose chimaera
 Shortnose sucker
 Shovelnose sturgeon
 Shrimpfish
 Siamese fighting fish
 Sillago
 Silver carp
 Silver dollar
 Silver dory
 Silver hake
 Silverside
 Silvertip tetra
 Sind danio
 Sixgill ray
 Sixgill shark
 Skate
 Skilfish
 Skipjack tuna
 Slender mola
 Slender snipe eel
 Sleeper
 Sleeper shark
 Slickhead
 Slimehead
 Slimy mackerel
 Slimy sculpin
 Slipmouth
 Smalleye squaretail
 Smalltooth sawfish
 Smelt
 Smelt-whiting
 Smooth dogfish
 Snailfish
 Snake eel
 Snakehead
 Snake mackerel
 Snapper
 Snipe eel
 Snipefish
 Snook
 Snubnose eel
 Snubnose parasitic eel
 Sockeye salmon
 Soldierfish
 Sole
 South American darter
 South American lungfish
 Southern Dolly Varden
 Southern flounder
 Southern hake
 Southern sandfish
 Southern smelt
 Spadefish
 Spaghetti eel
 Spanish mackerel
 Spearfish
 Speckled trout
 Spiderfish
 Spikefish
 Spinefoot
 Spiny basslet
 Spiny dogfish
 Spiny dwarf catfish
 Spiny eel
 Spinyfin
 Splitfin
 Spookfish
 Spotted climbing perch
 Spotted danio
 Spottail pinfish
 Sprat
 Springfish
 Squarehead catfish
 Squaretail
 Squawfish (disambiguation)
 Squeaker
 Squirrelfish
 Staghorn sculpin
 Stargazer
 Starry flounder
 Steelhead
 Stickleback
 Stingfish
 Stingray
 Stonecat
 Stonefish
 Stoneroller minnow
 Stream catfish
 Striped bass
 Striped burrfish
 Sturgeon
 Sucker
 Suckermouth armored catfish
 Summer flounder
 Sundaland noodlefish
 Sunfish
 Surf sardine
 Surfperch
 Surgeonfish
 Swallower
 Swamp-eel
 Swampfish
 Sweeper
 Swordfish
 Swordtail

T

 Tadpole cod
 Tadpole fish
 Tailor
 Taimen
 Tang
 Tapetail
 Tarpon
 Tarwhine
 Telescopefish
 Temperate bass
 Temperate ocean-bass
 Temperate perch
 Tench
 Tenpounder
 Tenuis
 Tetra
 Thorny catfish
 Thornfish
 Threadfin
 Threadfin bream
 Thread-tail
 Three spot gourami
 Threespine stickleback
 Three-toothed puffer
 Thresher shark
 Tidewater goby
 Tiger barb
 Tigerperch
 Tiger shark
 Tiger shovelnose catfish
 Tilapia
 Tilefish
 Titan triggerfish
 Toadfish
 Tommy ruff
 Tompot blenny
 Tonguefish
 Tope
 Topminnow
 Torpedo
 Torrent catfish
 Torrent fish
 Trahira
 Treefish
 Trevally
 Triggerfish
 Triplefin blenny
 Triplespine
 Tripletail
 Tripod fish
 Trout
 Trout cod
 Trout-perch
 Trumpeter
 Trumpetfish
 Trunkfish
 Tubeblenny
 Tube-eye
 Tube-snout
 Tubeshoulder
 Tui chub
 Tuna
 Turbot
 Two spotted goby

U

 Uaru
 Unicorn fish
 Upside-down catfish

V

 Vanjaram
 Velvet belly lanternshark
 Velvet catfish
 Velvetfish
 Vendace
 Vermilion snapper
 Vimba
 Viperfish

W

 Wahoo
 Walking catfish
 Wallago
 Walleye
 Walleye pollock
 Walu
 Warmouth
 Warty angler
 Waryfish
 Waspfish
 Weasel shark
 Weatherfish
 Weever
 Weeverfish
 Wels catfish
 Whale catfish
 Whalefish
 Whale shark
 Whiff
 Whitebait
 White croaker
 Whitefish
 White marlin
 White shark
 Whitetip reef shark
 Whiting
 Wobbegong
 Wolf-eel
 Wolffish
 Wolf-herring
 Worm eel
 Wormfish
 Wrasse
 Wrymouth

X
X-ray tetra

Y

 Yellow-and-black triplefin
 Yellowback fusilier
 Yellowbanded perch
 Yellow bass
 Yellowedge grouper
 Yellow-edged moray
 Yellow-eye mullet
 Yellowhead jawfish
 Yellowfin croaker
 Yellowfin cutthroat trout
 Yellowfin grouper
 Yellowfin tuna
 Yellowfin pike
 Yellowfin surgeonfish
 Yellowfin tuna
 Yellow jack
 Yellowmargin triggerfish
 Yellow moray
 Yellow perch
 Yellowtail
 Yellowtail amberjack
 Yellowtail barracuda
 Yellowtail clownfish
 Yellowtail horse mackerel
 Yellowtail kingfish
 Yellowtail snapper
 Yellow tang
 Yellow weaver
 Yellowtail catfish

Z

 Zander
 Zebra bullhead shark
 Zebra danio
 Zebrafish
 Zebra lionfish
 Zebra loach
 Zebra oto
 Zebra pleco
 Zebra shark
 Zebra tilapia
 Zebra turkeyfish
 Ziege
 Zingel

See also 
List of aquarium fish by scientific name
List of freshwater aquarium fish species
Diversity of fish

.